Hurricane Roslyn was a powerful tropical cyclone that was the strongest landfalling Pacific hurricane since Hurricane Patricia in 2015. The nineteenth named storm, tenth hurricane, and fourth major hurricane of the 2022 Pacific hurricane season, Roslyn formed on October 20, from an area of low pressure that developed off the southwestern coast of Mexico. Roslyn made landfall on October 23 near Santa Cruz in northern Nayarit, at 11:20 UTC with  winds. Inland, Roslyn weakened quickly to a tropical storm, and then dissipated over east-central Mexico on October 24.

Roslyn prompted the issuance of hurricane and tropical storm watches and warnings by the Mexican government for Western Mexico. More than 270 people evacuated from Roslyn and many activities were suspended. Around 150,000 people lost power and at least 5,000 houses were damaged. Four people were killed and only minor damage occurred.

Meteorological history 

A tropical wave entered the far eastern Pacific basin off the coast of Central America on October 16. The convection within it gradually increased over the next couple of days, and area of low pressure formed south of the southern coast of Mexico on October 19.

The depression, designated Nineteen-E by the National Hurricane Center, strengthened into Tropical Storm Roslyn 12 hours later. The storm steadily strengthened into the following day, tracking west-northwestward over warm near– waters and experiencing only minimal wind shear. By 15:00 UTC on October 21, a central dense overcast with overshooting tops formed near the storm's center, along with a partial eyewall beneath it. At 06:00 UTC the next day, Roslyn weakened to Category 3 strength due to increasing south-southwest wind shear. Now accelerating toward the north-northeast, its eye passed between Islas Marías and the coast of mainland Mexico a few hours later.

Roslyn made landfall near Santa Cruz in northern Nayarit at 11:20 UTC with  winds. Increasing southwesterly vertical wind shear and interaction with the mountainous terrain of Mexico caused the system to rapidly weaken, becoming a tropical storm later in the day. Then, by 00:00 UTC on October 24, Roslyn degenerated into a remnant low over east-central Mexico, west of Monterrey. Its remaining moisture and upper-level energy were then pulled northward into Texas by an advancing south-central U.S. cold front.

Preparations, impact, and aftermath 

In anticipation of Roslyn, the government of Mexico issued a hurricane warning for the coast extending from Playa Perula south of Cabo Corrientes, Jalisco, north to Escuinapa Municipality, Sinaloa, and for Las Islas Marias. Furthermore, Officials declared a precautionary alert for Jalisco, Colima, Nayarit, and Sinaloa. In Jalisco, ports were closed, as were schools and tourist venues in coastal municipalities. Several hundred people were evacuated from La Huerta; two shelters were set up in La Huerta along with an additional five in Puerto Vallarta. Officials in Nayarit reported that 3,000 people were evacuated from their homes in the municipalities of Santiago Ixcuintla and San Blas.

Cars were submerged and major damage occurred to roofs and outdoor coverings throughout coastal Nayarit. In Tepic, trees were blown down and flooded some streets, and a local highway was blocked after a landslide occurred. At least 5,000 houses were damaged. Four people were killed, including an 80-year-old man who died when a beam from a roof fell on him, and two women from collapsing buildings. Local Civil Protection Chief Adrián Bobadilla, stated that the damage was not significant, quoting "The biggest effect [of the hurricane] was from the waves, on some of the beachside infrastructure [but] we did not have any significant damage".  Oyster farmers in Santiago Ixcuintla, however, indicated that the losses were total. Roslyn brought high waves and heavy rainfall to Puerto Vallarta. Around 150,000 people across northern Mexico lost power. In Sinaloa, strong winds knocked down electricity wiring, trees, and poles, leaving many without electricity. Flash floods and power outages were reported in Puerto Vallarta. Governor of Jalisco Enrique Alfaro Ramírez stated that damages from the hurricane were minor.

Plan DN-III-E, a disaster relief and rescue plan, was activated in the states of Jalisco, Sinaloa, Colima and Nayarit. At least MX$70 million have been set aside for the reconstruction of areas in Nayarit. The Mexican Red Cross provided aid to families. The government of Escuinapa sent 5,000 tons, including groceries, pantries to victims of hurricane.

See also
 Weather of 2022
 Tropical cyclones in 2022
 Timeline of the 2022 Pacific hurricane season
 List of Category 4 Pacific hurricanes
 Other storms of the same name
 Hurricane Tico (1983) – Category 4 hurricane which affected the same areas
 Hurricane Kenna (2002) – Category 5 hurricane that had a comparable path
 Hurricane Willa (2018) – Category 5 hurricane that took an almost identical trajectory
 Hurricane Pamela (2021) – Category 1 hurricane which also had a similar track
 Hurricane Orlene (2022) – Category 4 hurricane that hit northwestern Mexico two weeks earlier

References

External links 

 The National Hurricane Center's advisory archive on Hurricane Roslyn

R
R
R
October 2022 events in Mexico
2022 in Mexico
R